Dysschema lygdamis is a moth of the family Erebidae first described by Herbert Druce in 1884. It seems restricted to the mountains of Costa Rica and Panama.

References

Moths described in 1884
Dysschema